Leonard Trevor Edwards (born 24 January 1937) is a former Wales international footballer. A defender, he played his club football for Charlton Athletic. He was part of the Wales squad for the 1958 FIFA World Cup in Sweden. In the sixties he emigrated to Australia, where he played for Sydney Hakoah, Melita Eagles and Marconi with whom he won the Australian Championship.

References

1937 births
People from Rhondda
Charlton Athletic F.C. players
Cardiff City F.C. players
Welsh footballers
1958 FIFA World Cup players
Wales under-23 international footballers
Wales international footballers
Living people
Parramatta FC players
Association football defenders